Porhydrus is a genus of beetles in the family Dytiscidae, containing the following species:

 Porhydrus genei (Aubé, 1838)
 Porhydrus lineatus (Fabricius, 1775)
 Porhydrus obliquesignatus (Bielz, 1852)
 Porhydrus vicinus (Aubé, 1838)

References

Dytiscidae